Ivan Sansom (born Prestatyn) is a British palaeontologist, Senior Lecturer in Palaeobiology at the University of Birmingham. His research primarily has focused on the conodont palaeobiology and the early Palaeozoic radiation of vertebrates.

Sansom is an editor of the Journal of the Geological Society.

In 2001 Sansom was a recipient of the Palaeontological Association's Hodson Award conferred on palaeontologists who have made a notable early contribution to the science.

Selected publications 
 Sansom, I. J., Smith, M. P., Armstrong, H. A. and Smith, M. M. 1992. Presence of the earliest vertebrate hard tissues in conodonts. Science 256: 1308-1311.]
 Sansom, I. J., Smith, M. P. and Smith, M. M. 1994. Dentine in conodonts. Nature 368: 591.
 Sansom, I. J., Smith, M. P. and Smith, M. M. 1996. Scales of thelodont and shark-like fishes from the Ordovician. Nature 379: 628-630.
 Smith, M. P., Sansom, I. J. and Repetski, J. E. 1996. Histology of the first fish. Nature 380: 702-704.
 Coates, M. I., Sequeira, S. E. K., Sansom, I. J. and Smith, M. M. 1998. Spines and tissues of ancient sharks. Nature 396: 729-730.
 Sansom, I. J., Donoghue, P. C. J. and Albanesi, G. L. 2005. Histology and affinity of the earliest armoured vertebrate. Biology Letters 2: 446-449.

References

External links
 Sansom's home page

British palaeontologists
Conodont specialists
Academics of the University of Birmingham
Year of birth missing (living people)
Living people
Paleobiologists
People from Prestatyn
Alumni of Aston University
Alumni of Durham University Graduate Society